Libinia is a genus of crabs in the family Epialtidae, containing twelve extant species:

Libinia bellicosa Oliviera, 1944
Libinia cavirostris Chace, 1942
Libinia dubia H. Milne-Edwards, 1834
Libinia erinacea (A. Milne-Edwards, 1879)
Libinia emarginata Leach, 1815
Libinia ferreirae De Brito Capello, 1871
Libinia mexicana Rathbun, 1892
Libinia peruana Garth, 1983
Libinia rhomboidea Streets, 1870
Libinia rostrata Bell, 1835
Libinia setosa Lockington, 1877
Libinia spinosa H. Milne-Edwards, 1834

References

Majoidea